Fairy Tale is a non-collectible card drafting game originally released in Japan where it was nominated for a Japan Boardgame Prize in 2005. It is printed in North America by Z-Man Games.

Gameplay

The game is played in four rounds with each round being played out in the same manner.

Each person is dealt a hand of five cards, then drafting occurs. When drafting each person chooses one card from their hand to keep and then passes the remaining four to his/her left and their neighbor does the same. This continues until everyone has five cards that they kept.

Next, each player simultaneously chooses one of his five cards, places it face down, then all cards are revealed simultaneously and ‘’Hunt’’ , ‘’unflip’’, and ‘’Flip’’ effects take place in that order (most cards have none of these abilities).

Hunt: Causes cards played in the same round to immediately be flipped face-down without their abilities taking effect. This only occurs in the advanced game.

Unflip: Allows a player to flip one of his/her face-down cards face-up. May be specific to a certain type of card.

Flip: Causes the player or all players (as specified on the card) to flip certain cards face-down.

The object of the game is to keep your cards face-up which is what gets you points at the end of each round. A round ends when each player has played three cards, the other two are discarded.

The game ends when four rounds have been played and everyone totals up the score of all their face-up cards.

Artwork

All artwork was done by a single artist, Yoko Nachigami. The artwork is noted for its anime style and bright pastel colors.

Release

Fairy Tale comes packaged in a box with two complete decks and contains 100 Cards (split into two decks/84 colored cards/16 black cards) and an instruction sheet.

The first edition was printed in 2005 and a Second edition was printed in 2008 in North America.

Reception

The game has been praised for its simplicity and easily learned gameplay. It is light and small enough to take on the go and can be played on any flat surface without taking up space. Its artwork has been praised but its light tone and white text have been criticized for being hard to see and indistinguishable against equally light colored cards (except for the black).

References

External links
 Game Geek Article

Card games introduced in 2004
Dedicated deck card games